Deep Song may refer to:

 Deep Song (album), Kurt Rosenwinkel, 2005
 Deep Song (ballet), Martha Graham, 1937
 Cante jondo 'Deep song', a vocal style in flamenco

See also 
 Deep image, a poetic style